Stephen P. Vaughn is the general counsel to the United States Trade Representative. Before Robert Lighthizer's confirmation as USTR, Vaughn served as the acting Trade Representative.

Vaughn worked at Skadden, Arps, Slate, Meagher & Flom representing U.S. Steel. In 2016, he became a partner at King & Spalding international trade group. He focused on international trade litigation and policy issues. He represented United States producers such as U.S. Steel and AK Steel.

Vaughn started his career in commercial litigation and shifted his career to trade law in the early 2000s. He was a professor of law at Georgetown Law School.

Vaughn served on President Donald Trump's landing team to the Office of the United States Trade Representative. Vaughn and official nominee Robert Lighthizer have worked together representing steel manufacturers in the past at Skadden Arps.

On March 2, 2017, due to the U.S. Senate's delay in confirming USTR nominee Robert Lighthizer, Trump appointed Vaughn to the position of USTR general counsel and elevated him to acting USTR. Vaughn's appointment was likely the first time that someone from outside the department was appointed as acting USTR. These appointments did not require Senate confirmation.

Vaughn's positions on U.S. trade policy have been compared to those of Alexander Hamilton and Trump.

On April 22, 2019, the USTR announced Vaughn would resign his position in the coming weeks.

References

External links 
USTR biography

Living people
Skadden, Arps, Slate, Meagher & Flom people
Trump administration cabinet members
United States Trade Representatives
Year of birth missing (living people)